The Liberal Party, commonly known as the Blue Party, was a political party in Paraguay, ruling the country for most of the period between 1904 and 1940.

History
The party was established in 1887 to represent the interests of landowners and middle class merchants. The Colorado Party was established in the same year and was dominant until the Liberal Revolution in 1904, after which the Liberal Party remained in government for almost the entire period until 1940.

However, the party was dissolved by Higinio Morinigo in 1942, and by the end of the 1947 revolution the Colorado Party was the only one left in the country. The Liberal Party continued to exist abroad and in 1963 the Renewal Group faction returned to the country to become the "official" opposition to the Stroessner regime. This caused a split in the party, with the remainder being renamed the Radical Liberal Party.

In the 1963 elections the party's candidate Ernesto Gavilan received 7.7% of the vote, whilst the party won 20 of the 60 seats in the Chamber of Deputies. In the Constitutional Assembly elections in 1967 the party won just eight of the 120 seats, finishing third behind the Colorado Party and the Radical Liberal Party. After this defeat the party was reduced to being the third party in the Stroessner regime. They won only three Chamber seats in the 1968 elections. It regained a seat in the 1973 elections, and remained at four seats after the 1978 elections. The 1983 elections saw the party win seven seats, which they retained in the 1988 elections.

After the Stroessner regime was overthrown, support for the party rapidly dwindled. In the 1989 elections the party received just 0.5% of the national vote and failed to win a seat. They failed to regain any seats in the 1993 elections, and did not contest any further elections.

Electoral history

Presidential elections

Chamber of Deputies elections

Senate elections

References

Political parties established in 1887
Defunct liberal political parties
Defunct political parties in Paraguay
Formerly banned political parties
Liberal parties in South America